Overnight Success (The Definitive Dave Dobbyn Collection 1979 – 1999) is a 1999 compilation album by New Zealand singer-songwriter Dave Dobbyn. It won an award in the "Film soundtrack/cast recording/compilation" category at the New Zealand Music Awards in 2000, and charted at number 15 in the New Zealand Music Chart.

Track listing

References

1999 greatest hits albums
Dave Dobbyn albums